The 2013 Colorado State Rams football team represented Colorado State University in the 2013 NCAA Division I FBS football season. The Rams were led by second-year head coach Jim McElwain and played their home games at Sonny Lubick Field at Hughes Stadium. They were members of the Mountain Division of the Mountain West Conference. They finished the season 8–6, 5–3 in Mountain West play to finish in third place in the Mountain Division. They were invited to the New Mexico Bowl where they defeated Washington State.

Schedule

Game summaries

vs Colorado

at Tulsa

Cal Poly

at Alabama

UTEP

San Jose State

at Wyoming

at Hawaii

Boise State

Nevada

at New Mexico

at Utah State

Air Force

Washington State (New Mexico Bowl)

Players in the 2014 NFL Draft

 * = undrafted free agent.

References

Colorado State
Colorado State Rams football seasons
New Mexico Bowl champion seasons
Colorado State Rams football